Corrhenes mastersi is a species of beetle in the family Cerambycidae. It was described by Blackburn in 1897.

References

Corrhenes
Beetles described in 1897